The 52nd Newfoundland and Labrador general election will take place on or before 14 October 2025 to elect members to the 51st General Assembly of Newfoundland and Labrador.

Current party standings

Timeline
31 March 2021: PC leader Ches Crosbie resigns and MHA David Brazil is appointed interim leader and interim Leader of the Opposition.
19 October 2021: St. John's Centre MHA Jim Dinn was named interim leader of the New Democratic Party, following the resignation of Alison Coffin.
25 October 2021: Torngat Mountains MHA Lela Evans leaves the PC Party to sit as an Independent in the House of Assembly.
7 March 2022: Torngat Mountains MHA Lela Evans announces she has joined the Newfoundland and Labrador New Democratic Party at a press conference with interim NDP leader Jim Dinn.
6 July 2022: A cabinet shuffle takes place, Haggie and Osborne switch portfolios.
12 September 2022: Premier Furey announced that Independent MHA Perry Trimper would be rejoining the Liberal caucus.
October 13 – 15, 2023: The Progressive Conservative party leadership convention will be held at the Sheraton Hotel in St. John’s.

Opinion polls

References

Opinion poll sources 

Elections in Newfoundland and Labrador